Asteroid Landed Softly is a metal and stone sculpture by Kazuo Matsubiyashi, installed in Salt Lake City, Utah, United States. The artwork measures approximately 30 x 4 x 2 feet. It features a boulder on top of a column which splits into two legs, and functions as a sundial. The artwork was surveyed by the Smithsonian Institution's "Save Outdoor Sculpture!" program in 1993.

References

Outdoor sculptures in Salt Lake City